Leucosyrinx luzonica is a species of sea snail, a marine gastropod mollusk in the family Pseudomelatomidae, the turrids and allies.

Description
The length of the shell attains 47.4 mm.

Distribution
This marine species occurs off Luzon Island, the Philippines at a depth of 1719 m.

References

 Powell, A.W.B. 1969. The family Turridae in the Indo-Pacific. Part. 2. The subfamily Turriculinae. Indo-Pacific Mollusca 2(10): 207–415, pls 188–324
 Lee Y.-C. 2001. Two new bathyal turrids (Gastropoda: Turridae) from West Pacific. Memoir, Malacological Society of Taiwan, 1: 7–9.

External links
 Gastropods.com: Comitas luzonica
 
 Kantor Yu.I., Fedosov A.E. & Puillandre N. (2018). New and unusual deep-water Conoidea revised with shell, radula and DNA characters. Ruthenica. 28(2): 47-82
 Specimen at MNHN, Paris
 
 Biolib.cz: Comitas luzonica

luzonica
Gastropods described in 1969